The Macedonian Basketball Super Cup, is a basketball tournament held annually. It is the third most important national title in Macedonian basketball after the Macedonian First League and Macedonian Basketball Cup. Currently, MZT Skopje Aerodrom holds the record for most titles won with 4, and Rabotnički and Nikol Fert with 2.

Past champions

Performance by club

References

External links
Macedonian Basketball Federation
КУП НА МАКЕДОНИЈА

supercup
Basketball supercup competitions in Europe
2000 establishments in the Republic of Macedonia